Gavrilo is a predominantly Serbian male given name, also found scarcely in other Slavic languages, being a variant of the biblical name Gabriel.

Serbian Patriarch Gavrilo I, Serbian Patriarch (1648-1655)
Serbian Patriarch Gavrilo II, Serbian Patriarch (1752)
Serbian Patriarch Gavrilo III, Serbian Patriarch (1752-1755)
Serbian Patriarch Gavrilo IV, Serbian Patriarch (1758)
Serbian Patriarch Gavrilo V (1881-1950), Serbian Patriarch
Gavrilo Princip (1894–1918), Bosnian Serb revolutionary, assassin of Archduke Franz Ferdinand of Austria
Gavrilo Lesnovski (Middle Ages), hermit
Gavrilo Kratovac, prota in Hilandar and translator from Greek to Serbian
Gavrilo Rodić (1812–1890), Austrian general
Gavrilo Vitković (1829–1902), Serbian professor, engineer and historian
Gavrilo Martsenkovich (18th century), Russian opera actor and singer

See also
Gavrilović

Slavic masculine given names
Serbian masculine given names

sr:Гаврило